Neil Joseph Johnson (born 3 December 1946 in Grimsby, Lincolnshire, England), is an English footballer who played as a winger in the Football League.

References

External links
Neil Johnson's Career

1946 births
Living people
English footballers
Footballers from Grimsby
Association football wingers
Charlton Athletic F.C. players
Tottenham Hotspur F.C. players
Torquay United F.C. players
English Football League players
Dover F.C. players